The Humen, also Bocca Tigris or Bogue, is a narrow strait in the Pearl River Delta that separates Shiziyang in the north and Lingdingyang in the south near Humen Town in China's Guangdong Province. It is the site of the Pearl River's discharge into the South China Sea. It contains the Port of Humen at Humen Town. The strait is formed by the islands of Chuenpi (p Chuanbi) and Anunghoy (p Aniangxie; also called , p Weiyuan) on the eastern side, and Taikoktow (大角头, p Dajiaotou) on the western side. Since 1997, the strait has been traversed by the Humen Pearl River Bridge. Bocca Tigris was the entry to China's only trading city, Kanton.

Name
The Latinate  is derived from the Portuguese , which is a calque of the Chinese and Cantonese name , literally meaning "The Tiger Gate". The name Bogue is also a corruption of the Portuguese Boca.

American Commodore Matthew Perry, who later played a leading role in the opening of Japan to the West, noted that: "Although the resemblance is not at first very striking, it becomes quite obvious after examination".

History 

Because of its strategic location as the naval gateway to the city of Guangzhou (Canton), the strait was strongly fortified during the Qing dynasty. It was defended by eight forts: Shakok (Shajiao), Taikok (Dajiao), Wangtung (Hengdang), Yung-an (Yong'an), Kung-ku (Gonggu), Chen-yuan (Zhenyuan), Ching-yuan (Jingyuan), and Wei-yuan. Between September 1809 and January 1810, Portuguese Navy ships based in Macau defeated a group of Chinese pirates in the Battle of the Tiger's Mouth.

The first major battle of the First Opium War between the United Kingdom and China occurred at the entrance of the Humen in the First Battle of Chuenpi on 3 November 1839. The British captured the Bogue forts in the Second Battle of Chuenpi on 7 January 1841 and the Battle of the Bogue on 23–26 February. The forts were recaptured on 2 April 1847 during the British Expedition to Canton. In the Second Opium War, the British recaptured the forts in the 1856 Battle of the Bogue on 12–13 November.

Geography 
Eastern shore: Humen Town in Dongguan City
Western shore: the Nansha District of Guangzhou City
Upper and Lower Hengdang Islands, or North and South Wangtong Islands, in the middle of the strait
Humen Pearl River Bridge
Several Qing dynasty forts, including:
Weiyuan Fort, near Humen Town
Shajiao Fort, in Humen Town

Port of Humen 
The Port of Humen at Humen Town serves as the port of the industrial city of Dongguan and as one of the big logistic hubs of the Pearl River Delta. It extends on the east shore of the delta beyond the strait all the way to the Dongjiang River. It is divided into five port areas:

Shatian Port Area: focuses on containers, chemicals, yard logistics, shoreline industry, and comprehensive trading services.  
Mayong Port Area: focuses on grain, vegetable oil, coal, construction materials, and break-bulk cargo.
Shajiao Port Area: focuses on passenger transport, leisure boating, and coastal transport and cabotage. 
Chang'an Port Area: focuses on large-scale deep-water berths and the waterfront industry.
Neihe Port Area: focuses on traditional waterborne transport services for the Dongguan industries.

Originally called Taiping port, the State Council approved it as an open port in 1983. It was merged with the Shatian port in June 1997 and renamed Humen port.

See also 
Treaty of the Bogue (1843)

Notes

References 
Taylor, Isaac (1898). Names and Their Histories: A Handbook of Historical Geography and Topographical Nomenclature (2nd ed.). London: Rivingtons.

External links 

Satellite view of Bocca Tigris on Google maps
 , painted by Clarkson Frederick Stanfield and engraved by Edward Goodall for Fisher's Drawing Room Scrap Book, 1832, with a poetical illustration by Letitia Elizabeth Landon, The Pirate's Song off Tiger Island.

Bodies of water of Guangdong
Pearl River (China)
Pearl River Delta
Straits of China